Galashkinskoe Naibstvo, self-designated as Vilayet Kalay, also known as Galashkinskiy Vilayet — Ingush administrative unit of the North Caucasian Imamate. The Naibstvo was the farthest region of the Imamate in the west and it was established on the territory of Galashian society with the center being the village of Galashki.

History 
Vilayet Kalay which was known in the Russian Empire as Galashkinskoe Naibstvo was established in March 1840 on the territory of Galashian society with the center of it being the village of Galashki, when the Karabulak (Orstkhoy) and Galashian societies joined the uprising of Chechnya and with their deputies together with Chechens solemnly swore allegiance to Imam Shamil in the large center village of Lesser Chechnya, Urus-Martan.

In 1851 the Naibstvo was disestablished when it was conquered by Russian Empire.

Ethnic composition of the population 

To the Ingush. The Galashians are first named as a part of the Ingush people by German academian J. A. Güldenstädt in the first ever in-depth description of peoples of the Caucasus in the 1770-1773, who named Galashki among other Ingush villages. During his expedition in the Caucasus mountains in the 1830's, lieutenant-general Johann Blaramberg mentions the Galashians as one of the Ingush tribes. In the Russian Empire, on the basis of scientific, statistical and ethnographic data, the Galashians were officially classified as Ingush. This is how the Galashians were perceived, that is, they were called Ingush, also in the Imamate of Imam Shamil. Encyclopedic Dictionary of Brockhaus and Efron mentions that the Galashians were artificially formed by the resettlement of the Ingush from the mountains to the plane. Historians Volkonsky, Pantyukhov, Kovalevsky, Martirosian and Krupnov mentioned Galashians as an Ingush society.

To the Chechens. The historian N. N. Nadezhdin in his work «Nature and People in the Caucasus and Beyond the Caucasus» for 1869 mentions Chechen societies: the tribes currently inhabiting Chechnya are known under the following name Galashevtsy, Karabulaki, etc. At the same time, the information of the historian A. P. Berge is known, which was published in Russkaia starina for 1882, where he mentions the Chechen societies of Galash and Karabulaks (Orstkhoy). In the Bulletin of the Imperial Russian Geographical Society for 1859, the inhabitants of the Galashevsky society were noted as Chechens.

Naibs 
 Naib Dudarov — apparently Ossetian (Tagaur) Aldar, who in April of 1846 went over to the side of the Imamate.
 Muhammad Anzorov-Mirza (1848-1851).

See also 
 Caucasian Imamate

 Galashians

Notes

References

Bibliography 
 
 
 
 
 
 
 
 
 
 
 Nadezhdin P. P. Caucasian mountains and highlanders // Nature and people in the Caucasus and beyond the Caucasus. — St. Petersburg: Printing house of V. Demakov, 1869. — S. 109. — 413 p.
 Berge A. P. The eviction of the highlanders from the Caucasus // Russian antiquity. — St. Petersburg, 1882. — T. 36. — No. 10−12.
 

History of Ingushetia
Former Muslim countries in Europe
History of the North Caucasus